Ivesia argyrocoma is a species of flowering plant in the rose family that is also known by its common name, silverhair mousetail. It is native to the San Bernardino Mountains of southwestern San Bernardino County, California. A population of Ivesia argyrocoma is also found in Baja California in Mexico; this population may or may not be distinct and further study is required. Ivesia argyrocoma is a small perennial herb producing a clump of fuzzy reddish naked stems that grow horizontal to the ground and a number of tail-like hairy leaves which grow erect and may curl or droop. The leaflets are green and covered in a dense coat of shiny silver hairs. Most of the leaves emerge from the base of the stem; a few very small ones may emerge farther up the stem. At the tip of the stem is an inflorescence of one or more clusters of glandular flowers. Each flower has generally five green and red, densely silver-haired, triangular sepals and five smaller oval or spoon-shaped white petals. The center of the Ivesia argyrocoma flowers contain twenty yellow-anthered white stamens and several pistils. The fruit is a tiny smooth brown achene.

References

External links
Jepson Manual Treatment
Photo gallery

argyrocoma
Flora of California
Flora of Baja California